Macapagal Boulevard, also known as President Diosdado Macapagal Boulevard and Macapagal Avenue, is an eight-lane road  in Metro Manila, Philippines, running parallel to Roxas Boulevard from the Cultural Center of the Philippines Complex in Pasay to Asia World City in Parañaque. It was named after former Philippine President Diosdado Macapagal. This road has three major bridges, crossing the 'channels', of which the largest is the Libertad Channel, where the Libertad Water Pumping Station is situated. Thanks to intersection reconfiguring around EDSA to relieve traffic, Macapagal Boulevard is now often used to access the SM Mall of Asia to the north and Cavite to the south. It is also the main major road in Metro Manila's reclamation area called Bay City.

Route description

Macapagal Boulevard commences at the intersection with Jose W. Diokno Boulevard, the partner highway in Bay City in the Cultural Center of the Philippines Complex in Pasay, where World Trade Center Metro Manila is located. It serves as the logical continuation of Magdalena Jalandoni Street. It heads south across Financial Center consisting of the Philippine National Bank headquarters and the Government Service Insurance System complex, which houses the Philippine Senate. South of the Libertad channel, the boulevard enters Metropolitan Park and the SM Central Business Park, intersecting with Epifanio de los Santos Avenue (EDSA) before entering the Aseana City development, home of the Department of Foreign Affairs–Office of Consular Affairs Building and Ayala Malls Manila Bay. At Asean Avenue, Macapagal traverses the Entertainment City gaming complex with Solaire Resort & Casino and City of Dreams Manila (formerly Belle Grande Manila) dominating this stretch up to Seaside Boulevard, an extension of NAIA Road. Near the Seaside Boulevard junction are the NAIA Expressway ramps that provide access to Ninoy Aquino International Airport and connect it to the Metro Manila Skyway. The Manila Southwest Integrated Bus Terminal is housed within the former Uniwide Coastal Mall grounds at Seaside Boulevard, while the Parañaque Integrated Terminal Exchange is located few meters south. Macapagal's current southern terminus is Pacific Avenue in Marina Baytown East village in Parañaque, where most traffic turns left towards the Manila–Cavite Expressway. It also has a short extension towards the southern edge of Asiaworld, with the Las Piñas–Parañaque Critical Habitat and Ecotourism Area as the terminating vista.

Landmarks

 Ayala Malls Manila Bay
 Blue Bay Walk
 City of Dreams Manila
 Dampa Seafood Market
 Department of Foreign Affairs–Office of Consular Affairs Building
 DoubleDragon Plaza
 HK Sun Plaza
 Hobbies of Asia
 Icon Hotel
 Manila Tytana Colleges
 Marina Bay Village
 Met Live Mall (built on the former site of Blue Wave Macapagal)
 Philippine National Bank Financial Center
 Sentosia Condominiums
 W Mall
 World Trade Center

Notes

References

Streets in Metro Manila